All Night Long: Live in Dallas is the second solo live album by the American singer-songwriter and multi-instrumentalist Joe Walsh.  The album was released as for digital download in 2013, and on the CD format in March 2014.

Background
The concert was recorded at the Reunion Arena in Dallas, Texas on July 10, 1981, for the King Biscuit Flower Hour radio show. At the time, Walsh was touring in support of his latest solo album There Goes the Neighborhood following the breakup of Eagles. Reunited with one of his bandmates from Barnstorm (his post-James Gang solo group), Walsh recorded a set that included  solo hits, and some tracks from his years with the James Gang. The concert concluded with a cover of the Beatles' "Get Back".

Track listing

Personnel
 Joe Walsh — lead vocals, guitars, piano 
 Russ Kunkel — drums
 Mike Murphy — keyboards (Reo Speedwagon)
 George "Chocolate" Perry — bass guitar, backing vocals
 Joe Vitale — drums, flute, keyboards, backing vocals

References

2014 live albums
Joe Walsh albums